The Festival de Cine Entre Largos y Cortos de Oriente, better known as ELCO, is a Venezuelan film festival.

History 
The festival is run by the ELCO Foundation, which aims to promote and distribute national cinema as a means of encouraging new artists into the industry. Its first edition was in September 2011.

It accepts entries in all style of film, from anyone anywhere in the world, and was said to be "one of the fastest growing film festivals in Venezuela" by director Vadim Lasca in 2016.

The festival is judged by many famous writers, directors, and producers of the country, and the ELCO Grand Prize "represents one of the most important statuettes in Venezuelan cinema".

The 2019 edition will be held in Venezuela and Ecuador.

Award Categories 
There have been different awards throughout the festival's span. The awards as of the ninth edition are:

Margot Benacerraf Feature Film Awards 

 ELCO Grand Prize
 Best Fiction Feature Film
 Best Documentary Feature
 Best Animated Feature Film
 Audience Award

Román Chalbaud Short Film Awards 

 Best Short Film ELCO
 Best Fiction Short Film
 Best Documentary Short Film
 Best Short Film Animation
 Best University Short Film

Past categories
The categories awarded at the third edition were:

Feature films

Short films

References 

Film festivals in Venezuela